Mallard is a community in the Canadian province of Manitoba.

Demographics 

Notable people
Brigette Lacquette is the first First Nations woman to play hockey for Team Canada at the Winter Olympics in 2018. She is from Mallard, Manitoba.

References

Designated places in Manitoba
Northern communities in Manitoba